Lirachiton is an extinct genus of polyplacophoran molluscs. Lirachiton became extinct in the Pliocene period.

Species
 † Lirachiton inexpectus (Ashby & Cotton, 1939)

References

External links
 Ashby, E. & Cotton, B. C. (1939). New fossil chitons from the Miocene and Pliocene of Victoria. Records of the South Australian Museum. 6(3): 209–242, pls. 19–21

Prehistoric chiton genera